Following is a list of dams and reservoirs in Nevada.

All major dams are linked below.

Dams and reservoirs in Nevada

This list is incomplete.  You can help Wikipedia by expanding it.

 21 Mile Dam, Lucin 
 Cave Creek Dam, Cave Creek Reservoir, Nevada Department of Conservation and Natural Resources 
 Davis Dam, Lake Mohave, United States Bureau of Reclamation 
 Derby Dam (diversion dam), USBR
 Echo Canyon Dam, Echo Canyon Reservoir, Nevada DCNR
 Hoover Dam, Lake Mead, USBR
 Lahontan Dam, Lake Lahontan, USBR
 Rye Patch Dam, Rye Patch Reservoir, USBR
 South Fork Dam, South Fork Reservoir, Nevada DCNR 
 Lake Tahoe Dam, Lake Tahoe, USBR (on California / Nevada border)
 unnamed levee, Topaz Lake, Walker River Irrigation District (on California / Nevada border)
 Wild Horse Dam, Wild Horse Reservoir, Bureau of Indian Affairs

References 

Nevada
Dams
Dams